is a Japanese surname. Notable people with this surname include:

Ichiro Maehara, Hawaiian baseball player from the 1960s onward.
Shiyuna Maehara (前原しゆな), former member of j-pop group BeForU.
Seiji Maehara (前原 誠司), former leader of the 2016 iteration of the Japanese Democratic Party.

Fictional characters
, a character in Love Hina
, a character in the Assassination Classroom anime and manga

See also
Maehara Stadium, Wailuku, Hawaii
8036 Maehara

Japanese-language surnames